Henry Ruhl Guss (July 28, 1825 – April 25, 1907) was a Union Army officer during the American Civil War. He organized and commanded the 97th Pennsylvania Infantry Regiment out of Chester and Delaware Counties in Pennsylvania.  He served as a colonel and was brevetted brigadier general and major general after the war in recognition of his service.

Early life and education
Guss was born on July 28, 1825 in Chester Springs, Pennsylvania and moved with his family to West Chester, Pennsylvania in 1836. He was educated at local day schools and at the Joshua Hoopes Academy. He worked in brick manufacturing and was the proprietor of the Green Tree Inn in West Chester.

He founded a volunteer militia company, the National Guards of West Chester, in 1846.  He was commissioned first lieutenant of the company by Governor William Bigler on September 11, 1854 and as commanding officer on June 6, 1859 by Governor William F. Packer.

Military career
On April 21, 1861, Guss and over 300 men from the National Guards answered President Abraham Lincoln's call for 75,000 volunteers and marched to Harrisburg, Pennsylvania.  Three companies were formed from these troops and became part of the 9th Regiment, Pennsylvania Volunteers.  Guss served as captain of company A. On July 29, 1861, the 9th Regiment was mustered out of service.

On July 25, 1861, Guss was commissioned as colonel and given authority from the Secretary of War to raise a regiment from Chester and Delaware Counties which became the 97th Pennsylvania Infantry. The 97th was assigned to the Expeditionary Corps in Hilton Head, South Carolina under Brigadier General Horatio Gates Wright. Guss and the 97th fought at the Siege of Fort Pulaski, the occupation of Fort Clinch, the Battle of Grimball's Landing and the Battle of Secessionville.

He tendered his resignation on June 22, 1864 and was succeeded by Lieutenant Colonel Galusha Pennypacker. On May 21, 1867, by recommendation of U.S. Congressman John M. Broomall, Guss received a promotion from Secretary of War, Edwin M. Stanton, to brevet Brigadier General and on June 17, 1867 to brevet Major General for faithful and meritorious services in the field during the war.

He served as president of the Society of the Ninety-seventh Regiment of Pennsylvania Volunteers and hosted a reunion in 1884 at the Green Tree Hotel. He was an Uncle to the Old West showman Buffalo Bill.

He died in West Chester on April 25, 1907 and was interred at Oaklands Cemetery.

See also

List of American Civil War brevet generals (Union)

References

External links
97th Regiment Pennsylvania Volunteers

1825 births
1907 deaths
19th-century American businesspeople
American hoteliers
Brick manufacturers
Burials at Oaklands Cemetery
Pennsylvania National Guard personnel
People of Pennsylvania in the American Civil War
People from West Chester, Pennsylvania
Union Army colonels
Union Army generals